List of thalattosuchian-bearing stratigraphic units, or geologic formations.

Introduction
Thalattosuchia is the name given to a clade of marine crocodylomorphs from the Early, Middle, and Late Jurassic period eras to the Early Cretaceous period era, that had a cosmopolitan distribution.

They are colloquially referred to as 'marine crocodiles' or 'sea crocodiles' though they are not members of Crocodilia.

List

T
Jurassic crocodylomorphs
Cretaceous crocodylomorphs
Early Jurassic crocodylomorphs
Middle Jurassic crocodylomorphs
Late Jurassic crocodylomorphs
Early Cretaceous crocodylomorphs